Vilafranca de Bonany is a small municipality in the district of Pla on Majorca, one of the Balearic Islands in Spain.  It is an agricultural town, known for its market stalls along the highway selling spices, fruits, and vegetables as well as tiny doughnuts called bunyols in Majorcan language and buñuelos in Spanish, and also known for the historic Santa Barbara Church built in the 1730s.

In the northeast outskirts of the town is a 17th-century monastery called Ermita de Bonany, or Hermitage of Bonany.  It was built in thanks for a good harvest; the name "Bonany" literally means "good year".

This town borders Felanitx, Porreres, Sant Joan, Petra (birthplace of Junípero Serra) and Manacor.

References

External links

Ajuntament de Vilafranca de Bonany

Municipalities in Mallorca
Populated places in Mallorca